The 12947 / 12948 Azimabad Express is a Superfast Express train running between two capital cities of Ahmedabad in Gujarat and Patna in Bihar.
"Azimabad" was the old name of Patna during the later Mughal period.

Service
It operates as train number 12947 from Ahmedabad Junction to Patna Junction and as train number 12948 in the reverse direction, serving the states of Gujarat, Madhya Pradesh, Rajasthan, Uttar Pradesh & Bihar.

As the average speed of the train is above , as per Indian Railways rules, its fare includes a Superfast surcharge.

Coaches
Azimabad runs with standard LHB 22 coaches AC 2 Tier, AC 3 Tier, General & SLR.
No pantry car is routinely available but may be attached.

Routeing

Traction
As the route is fully electrified, a Vadodara-based WAP-7 (HOG)-equipped locomotive hauls the train.

See also
 Garbha Express

References

External links
12947 Azimabad Express at India Rail Info
12948 Azimabad Express at India Rail Info

Transport in Ahmedabad
Express trains in India
Railway services introduced in 2007
Transport in Patna
Rail transport in Bihar
Rail transport in Uttar Pradesh
Rail transport in Gujarat
Rail transport in Rajasthan
Rail transport in Madhya Pradesh
Named passenger trains of India